Shotai may refer to:

 Shotai – a Japanese typeface
 a shotai – a military unit in Japan, equivalent to a platoon, flight (military unit), or section (military unit)
 Shōtai – the Japanese era name for the period from April 898 to July 901

See also
 Plique-à-jour – a vitreous enamelling technique often known by its Japanese name of shotai-jippo (or shotai shippo).